Ludwig Anders Ahgren (born July 6, 1995), known mononymously as Ludwig, is an American live streamer, YouTuber, podcaster, esports commentator and competitor. Ahgren is best known for his live streams on Twitch from 2018 through late 2021, and on YouTube beginning in late 2021, where he broadcasts video-game-related content as well as non-video-game-related content such as game shows and contests. He is also known for his work as an esports commentator at various Super Smash Bros. Melee tournaments. He is co-owner of the esports organization Moist Esports. He began streaming full-time on February 16, 2019.

While holding a widely publicized "subathon" event, Ahgren became the most subscribed Twitch streamer of all time in 2021, eventually reaching around 282,000 subscribers at its peak, beating the previous record set by fellow streamer Ninja. On November 29, 2021, Ahgren announced that he had signed an exclusive deal with YouTube Gaming. At the 2022 Streamer Awards, Ahgren won the award for "Streamer of the Year".

Personal life 
Ludwig Anders Ahgren was born July 6, 1995, in Hollis, New Hampshire. Ahgren has French and Swedish ancestry. He attended Arizona State University, where he was a member of the Tempe Underground (formerly Tempe Late Night) stand-up and improv comedy club. He graduated cum laude with degrees in English literature and journalism in 2017.

Career

Twitch 
Ahgren began live streaming on Twitch part-time on May 16, 2018, becoming full-time on February 16, 2019. During 2018 and 2019, Ahgren's stream had a relatively small audience, mostly streaming the video games Super Smash Bros. Melee, Mario Party 2, and Dark Souls. On November 10, 2019, Ahgren set the world record for the button mashing mini-game Domination from Mario Party 4. According to Polygon, Ahgren's record was faster than a tool-assisted speedrun bot; according to Kotaku, this is false, since the bot was capped at a score of 160, while Ahgren was playing on a modified version that removes the cap. Polygon's Owen S. Good said, "If aliens landed and I had to explain what video games are and why they are fun, I'd show them this. Take a bow, Ludwig".

In January 2020, Ahgren, among other Melee competitors and personalities, such as Mew2King and Plup, competed in an invitational tournament for Pokémon Sword and Shield by 2016 Pokémon World Champion, Wolfe Glick, where Ahgren finished first. In June 2020, Ahgren was invited to compete against other popular Twitch streamers in the amateur chess tournament PogChamps of Chess.com, placing second in the consolation bracket. Ahgren subsequently made an appearance on the cover of the August 2020 edition of Chess Life.

In November 2020, after the Melee tournament The Big House 10 received a cease and desist letter from Nintendo, Ahgren announced the Ludwig Ahgren Championship Series 3, an impromptu charity tournament. Taking place between December 20 and 21, it raised over $261,668 for Gamers for Love.

In December 2020, both Ahgren's YouTube channel and his Twitch channel reached over one million followers; Cale Michael of Dot Esports credited his rapid growth to his "Twitch stream expanding, continued collaboration with other big creators, and his willingness to try new forms of content out both live and for his YouTube channel." Also in December, Ahgren released a Christmas album, A Very Mogul Christmas, to allow streamers to listen to Christmas music without DMCA issues.

In January 2021, Ahgren began hosting a game show on Twitch, titled Hivemind, with fellow streamer Cr1TiKaL. In October 2021, Ahgren was among a multitude of streamers whose earnings from Twitch were revealed in a data breach; between August 2019 and October 2021, Ahgren had earned $3.3 million through Twitch, which Ahgren confirmed.

Subathon 

On March 14, 2021, Ahgren held a subathon that ran for 30 days, ending on April 13, 2021. A "subathon", short for "subscription marathon", is a type of livestream on Twitch where every time a streamer receives a subscription— donations from viewers—more time is added to a descending timer. Once the timer reaches zero, the stream ends. Ahgren received around 282,000 subscriptions during his subathon, breaking the previous record set in 2018 by Tyler "Ninja" Blevins of the most concurrent subscribers on Twitch.

Move to YouTube 
On November 29, 2021, Ahgren announced he would depart from live streaming on Twitch, and moved to YouTube Gaming on November 30. He announced this with a short comedy sketch, where he blew up a purple car symbolizing Twitch. According to Dot Esports, Ahgren cited his move to YouTube as one of the reasons why Twitch later relaxed its exclusivity rules for its partnered streamers.

In December 2021, Ahgren received two DMCA-related bans, temporarily suspending his streams. On September 11, 2022, Ahgren was banned for a third time during a stream where he deliberately played the copyrighted song "Go!!!" to see how quickly he would be banned. He was banned after one minute and thirty-one seconds which he claimed was a "world record".

On July 2, 2022, Ludwig hosted an in-person version of his game show, Mogul Money Live, to over 5,000 people at the YouTube Theater. Contestants included Pokimane, xQc, Sykkuno, Mizkif, Sodapoppin, and Fuslie; among others. Sykkuno won the show and was rewarded with a "golden toilet". The event set a new streaming record on Ludwig's YouTube channel, with 146,699 viewers at its peak.

On September 23, 2022, Ahgren announced a chess boxing event, the Mogul Chessboxing Championship, that was held on December 11, 2022, in the Galen Center in Los Angeles; It featured both streamers and professional chess players. In the event, Ahgren was both co-host and a participant in a surprise chess-slap match with Connor Colquhoun. On September 27, 2022, Ahgren announced the founding of the creative agency Offbrand, along with fellow streamers Brandon 'Atrioc' Ewing, Nathan Stanz, and Nick Allen.

On September 28, 2022, Ahgren and Jschlatt, a fellow content creator, founded the YouTube channel "Lud and Schlatts Musical Emporium", a project to release royalty-free recordings of famous compositions and two original songs in the style of Nintendo video game music for the use in content creation. On October 15, Ahgren announced Swipe, his bidet product line.

From October 21 to 23, 2022, Ahgren organized an invitational tournament for Super Smash Bros. Melee and Super Smash Bros. Ultimate in Las Vegas, Nevada with 32-player brackets and a prize pool of $30,002 for both games, which was increased to $52,502 due to a cross-promotion with Capital One. The event was broadcast across Ahgren's and Alpharad's channels. On October 20, the day before the event was scheduled to begin, Ahgren revealed that a major sponsor had backed out at the last minute. YouTuber MrBeast signed on as a sponsor through his company Feastables. According to Ahgren and tournament organizer Aiden 'Calvin' McCaig, the event cost $200,000 to produce. 

Ahgren would host another Smash invitational, the Scuffed World Tour, on December 18, 2022, in light of community uproar surrounding Nintendo and Panda due to the cancellation of the 2022 Smash World Tour Championships. Intending to rival Panda's Panda Cup Finale, which was to be held on the same weekend before it got postponed, Ahgren invited the top sixteen Melee and Ultimate players from Smash World Tour 2022 to compete with the primary goal of raising money to support VGBootCamp, the organizers of Smash World Tour.

In January 2023, Ahgren announced that he joined Moist Esports as a co-owner.

Awards and nominations

Filmography

Music videos

Discography

Albums 
 A Very Mogul Christmas (2020)

References

Primary sources 
In the text, these references are preceded by a double dagger (‡):

Further reading

External links 
 
 Offbrand

1995 births
Living people
Twitch (service) streamers
Super Smash Bros. Melee players
Video game commentators
People from Hollis, New Hampshire
Walter Cronkite School of Journalism and Mass Communication alumni
American people of French descent
American people of Swedish descent
YouTube streamers
Streamer Award winners
The Game Awards winners
YouTube channels launched in 2011
YouTubers from New Hampshire